Sergio Quiróz (born February 15, 1986 in Culiacán, Sinaloa, Mexico) is a Mexican former professional footballer who played for Dorados de Sinaloa of the Ascenso MX.

References

Liga MX players
Living people
Mexican footballers
Club Tijuana footballers
Dorados de Sinaloa footballers
Coras de Nayarit F.C. footballers
Ascenso MX players
1986 births
Association football defenders